The men's 440 yards event at the 1966 British Empire and Commonwealth Games was held on 8 and 11 August at the Independence Park in Kingston, Jamaica. It was the last time that the imperial distance was contested at the Games later replaced by the 400 metres.

Medalists

Results

Heats

Qualification: First 2 in each heat (Q) and the next 2 fastest (q) qualify for the semifinals.

Semifinals

Qualification: First 4 in each heat (Q) qualify directly for the final.

Final

References

Athletics at the 1966 British Empire and Commonwealth Games
1966